Heikki Järn (born 23 September 1941) is a Finnish ice hockey player. He competed in the men's tournament at the 1972 Winter Olympics.

References

External links
 

1941 births
Living people
Finnish ice hockey forwards
Olympic ice hockey players of Finland
Ice hockey players at the 1972 Winter Olympics
People from Karkkila
Sportspeople from Uusimaa